Frederick Harold Kerans (1849 – 17 April 1894) was a British barrister and politician.

Born at Hooton Levitt Hall, near Rotherham, Kerans was educated at Rugby School.  He became a barrister in 1873.  At the 1885 UK general election, he stood unsuccessfully for the Conservative Party in Lincoln, but he won the seat in 1886.  He described himself as a "liberal Conservative".  He was defeated at the 1892 UK general election, and served as a deputy lieutenant of Lincolnshire until his death, in 1894.

References

1849 births
1894 deaths
Conservative Party (UK) MPs for English constituencies
Members of the Parliament of the United Kingdom for Lincoln
Politicians from Yorkshire
UK MPs 1886–1892
Members of the Inner Temple